The 2000–01 Busta Cup was the 35th edition of what is now the Regional Four Day Competition, the domestic first-class cricket competition for the countries of the West Indies Cricket Board (WICB). It was played from 4 January to 19 February 2001.

Eight teams contested the competition, which was played as a round-robin. The six regular teams of West Indian domestic cricket (Barbados, Guyana, Jamaica, the Leeward Islands, Trinidad and Tobago, and the Windward Islands) were joined by a development team (West Indies B) and an invited overseas team (England A). Barbados and Guyana finished equal on points, but Barbados topped the table by winning more matches, claiming a 17th domestic first-class title. The Busta Cup was followed by a brief knockout competition called the Busta International Shield. It was played from 23 February to 5 March, featuring the top four teams from the Busta Cup, and was won by Jamaica.

Both the Busta Cup and the Busta International Shield were sponsored by S. M. Jaleel and Company, the manufacturers of the Busta soft drink brand. The tournament featured the largest amount of prize money ever offered for a West Indian regional competition. The overall winners of the Busta Cup and Busta International Shield won US$7,000 and $10,000, respectively, while teams playing England A could win $7,500 for a first innings lead and $15,000 for an outright win. Additionally, $50,000 was on offer to any player who either scored 1,000 runs or took 65 wickets, although that prize was unclaimed.

Points table

Key

 W – Outright win (12 points)
 L – Outright loss (0 points)
 LWF – Lost match, but won first innings (4 points)

 DWF – Drawn, but won first innings (6 points)
 DLF – Drawn, but lost first innings (3 points)
 Pts – Total points

Statistics

Most runs
The top five run-scorers are included in this table, listed by runs scored and then by batting average.

Most wickets

The top five wicket-takers are listed in this table, listed by wickets taken and then by bowling average.

See also
 2000–01 Red Stripe Bowl

References

West Indian cricket seasons from 2000–01
2001 in West Indian cricket
Regional Four Day Competition seasons
Domestic cricket competitions in 2000–01